Padaiveedu is a panchayat town in Komarapalayam taluk Namakkal district in the Indian state of Tamil Nadu.

Demographics
 India census, Padaiveedu had a population of 10,031. Males constitute 53% of the population and females 47%. Padaiveedu has an average literacy rate of 55%, lower than the national average of 59.5%: male literacy is 63%, and female literacy is 46%. In Padaiveedu, 9% of the population is under 6 years of age.

Padaiveedu Panchayat Located in Kavandanoor. It's near by salem 40 km. It's located in NH 47 Salem-Coimbatore.

There is a large India Cements factory in this area. It employs many people and creates a lot of lorry traffic on roads.

K.R.P Matric Higher Secondary school and Sankar high school are the well known schools nearby. K.R.P. College of Education is also one of the familiar education college in that area.

Hockey is the main sport here where Sankar higher secondary school produced lot of players for state and district.

Indian Overseas Bank has the branch in Padiveedu.

The nearest airport is in Coimbatore.

Major business has been textile looms, lorry-proprietors and bus proprietors.

References

Cities and towns in Namakkal district